Joan Brown (1938–1990) was an American figurative painter.

Joan Brown may also refer to:
 Joan Brown (artist, born 1945), American artist, illustrator and educator
 Joan Brown (potter) (1926–2016), British potter
 Joan Myers Brown, American dance instructor
 Joan Heller Brown, American pharmacologist
 Joan Mary Wayne Brown (1906–1998), English children's writer

See also
 Joan Browne, mother of actor Alan Alda